

1950

 February / March - The series The Adventures of Bob Hope was debuted. 
June - The character Deadshot was debuted by David Vern Reed, Lew Sayre Schwartz and Bob Kane. 
 July - The character King Faraday was debuted by Robert Kanigher and Carmine Infantino. Atom Man vs. Superman film serial was debuted. 
 August / September - The series Strange Adventures was debuted.  
 September / October- The character Lana Lang was debuted by Bill Finger and John Sikela.
 December - The first Knight and Squire are debuted by Bill Finger and Dick Sprang.

1951 

January Whip(Johnny Lash)
February Killer Moth(Cameron Van Cleer) And Red Hood(Joker)
March Key
May Trigger Twins
June Captain Comet
October King Krull
November Doctor Thirteen

1952

1953

1954

1955

1956

1957

1958

1959

See also
 Golden Age of Comics
 Silver Age of Comics

References

DC Comics